McMurrich/Monteith is a municipality and census subdivision in the Almaguin Highlands region of Parry Sound District, Ontario, Canada.

The municipality was formed in 1998 through an amalgamation of the former Township of McMurrich and the eastern two-thirds of the unincorporated Township of Monteith.  The remaining portion of Monteith became part of Seguin. Part of the area's name is named for John McMurrich.

Communities
The township includes the communities of Axe Lake, Banbury, Bear Lake, Bourdeau, Haldane Hill, McMurrich, Sprucedale and Whitehall.

Demographics 

Mother tongue statistics for the 2006 census  are as follows:
 English as first language: 90.6%
 French as first language: 1.9%
 English and French as first language: 0%
 Other as first language: 7.5%

Lakes
 Doe Lake
 Buck Lake
 Axe Lake
 Johnson Lake
 Hunters Lake
 Bear Lake
 Horn Lake

See also
List of townships in Ontario

References

External links

Municipalities in Parry Sound District
Single-tier municipalities in Ontario
Township municipalities in Ontario